The Merit Cross for War Aid was a war decoration of Prussia awarded during World War I.  Instituted 5 December 1916, the cross was awarded for patriotic war aid service, without regard to status or rank.

Appearance
The Merit Cross for War Aid is in the shape of a Maltese cross, typically found made of blackened Kriegsmetall alloy. The obverse of the cross bears a circular central medallion with the crowned cipher of King Wilhelm II.  On the reverse the central medallion is inscribed FÜR KRIEGS-HILFSDIENST (For War Aid Merit) above an oak wreath.  To the upper arm is attached a loop for suspension from its ribbon.

References

Military awards and decorations of Prussia